Eastern Military District (Milo Ö), originally IV Military District was a Swedish military district, a command of the Swedish Armed Forces that had operational control over Eastern Sweden, for most time of its existence corresponding to the area covered by the counties of Östergötland, Södermanland, Stockholm, Uppsala and Västmanland. The headquarters of Milo Ö were located in Strängnäs.

History 
Milo Ö was created in 1966 along with five other military districts as part of a reorganisation of the administrative divisions of the Swedish Armed Forces. It can be seen as the successor of IV Military District (IV. militärområdet) created in 1942, but that did not have the same tasks as Milo Ö. The military area consisted of the land covered by the above-mentioned counties, and from the creation to 1982, also the southern part of Gävleborg County. In 1991, the number of military districts of Sweden was decreased to five, and as a consequence of that, Milo Ö was merged with Bergslagen Military District (Milo B) to create a new military district, Middle Military Area (Milo M).

Heraldry and traditions

Coat of arms
The coat of arms of the Eastern Military District Staff 1983–1991. Blazon: "Azur, an erect sword with the area letter (Ö - East) surrounded by an open chaplet of oak leaves, all or."

Commanding officers

Military commanders

1942–1943: Erik Testrup (also Commandant General)
1943–1944: Helge Jung (also Commandant General)
1944–1944: Axel Rappe (also Commandant General) 
1944–1945: Arvid Moberg (acting military commander and Commandant General)
1945–1957: Gustaf Dyrssen (also Commandant General)
1957–1961: Bert Carpelan (also Commandant General)
1961–1967: Gustav Åkerman (also Commandant General until 1966)
1967–1969: Carl Eric Almgren (also Commandant General)
1969–1974: Ove Ljung (also Commandant General)
1974–1976: Nils Sköld (also Commandant General)
1976–1982: Gunnar Eklund (also Commandant General)
1982–1988: Bengt Lehander (also Commandant General)
1988–1991: Bror Stefenson (also Commandant General)

Deputy military commanders
1942–1945: Arvid Moberg
1945–1953: Pehr Janse
1953–1955: Sven Erhard Öberg
1955–1959: Hadar Cars
1959–1963: Bengt Brusewitz
1963–1967: Carl A:son Klingenstierna

Chiefs of Staff

1942–1946: Gunnar af Klintberg
1946–1949: Carl-Johan Wachtmeister
1949–1952: Per Tamm
1952–1955: Carl Eric Svärd
1955–1957: Åke Wahlgren
1957–1959: Jan-Erik Vilhelm Landin
1959–1960: Bengt Liljestrand
1960–1961: Stig Waldenström
1961–1965: Karl-Gösta Lundmark
1966–1970: Bengt Lundvall
1970–1973: Hans Neij
1973–1978: Nils-Fredrik Palmstierna
1978–1980: Erik G. Bengtsson
1980–1984: Gustaf Welin
1984–1985: Roland Grahn
1985–1990: Jörn Beckmann
1990–1991: Bengt Anderberg

Names, designations and locations

See also
Military district (Sweden)

Footnotes

References

Notes

Print

Web

Military districts of Sweden
Disbanded units and formations of Sweden
Military units and formations established in 1942
Military units and formations disestablished in 1991
1942 establishments in Sweden
1991 disestablishments in Sweden
Stockholm Garrison
Strängnäs Garrison